Vitez may refer to:

"Knight" in Serbo-Croatian language
Recipients of the Knighthood in the Independent State of Croatia
Recipients of the Hungarian Knightly Order of Vitéz
Vitez, a town in Bosnia and Herzegovina
Michael Vitez (born 1957), American journalist 
Silviu Vitez (born 1995), Romanian Muaythai Kickboxer
Zlatko Vitez (born 1950), Croatian actor